{{DISPLAYTITLE:C17H27NO3}}
The molecular formula C17H27NO3 (molar mass: 293.40 g/mol, exact mass: 293.1991 u) may refer to:

 Embutramide
 Nordihydrocapsaicin
 Nonivamide, or PAVA
 Pramocaine

Molecular formulas